The 1966 Sacramento State Hornets football team represented Sacramento State College—now known as California State University, Sacramento—as a member of the Far Western Conference (FWC) during the 1966 NCAA College Division football season. Led by sixth-year head coach Ray Clemons, Sacramento State compiled an overall record of 8–2 with a mark of 6–0 in conference play, winning the FWC title. The team outscored its opponents 205 to 102 for the season. The Hornets played home games at Charles C. Hughes Stadium in Sacramento, California.

Schedule

Team players in the NFL
The following Sacramento State players were selected in the 1967 NFL Draft.

References

Sacramento State
Sacramento State Hornets football seasons
Northern California Athletic Conference football champion seasons
Sacramento State Hornets football